Yovel Zoosman (born May 12, 1998) is an Israeli professional basketball player for Alba Berlin of the German Basketball Bundesliga and the EuroLeague. Zoosman was named the FIBA Europe Under-20 Championship MVP in 2018. He was named the 2020 Israeli Basketball Premier League Defensive Player of the Year.

Biography
Yovel Zoosman was born in Kfar Saba, Israel, to a Jewish family. He was raised in Netanya and played for Elitzur Netanya youth team. He joined Wingate Institute and Maccabi Tel Aviv in his late teens.

Sports career
In 2015, Zoosman started his professional career with Maccabi Tel Aviv. On October 18, 2015, Zoosman made his professional debut in an Israeli ISBL game, in an 85–70 win over Bnei Herzliya, recording two points off the bench.

On August 24, 2016, Zoosman was loaned to Maccabi Ra'anana of the Liga Leumit, the second level league in Israel. In 28 games played with Ra'anana, he averaged 11.7 points, 3.6 rebounds, 2.3 assists and 1.8 steals per game, while shooting 41 percent from 3-point range. Zoosman helped Ra'anana reach the Liga Leumit Playoffs as the first seed, but they eventually were eliminated by Maccabi Hod HaSharon in the Quarterfinals.

Maccabi Tel Aviv 
On July 27, 2017, Zoosman signed a four-year contract extension with Maccabi Tel Aviv. On June 8, 2018, Zoosman was named the 2018 Israeli League Rising Star. Zoosman helped Maccabi win the 2017 Israeli League Cup and the 2018 Israeli League Championship.

On January 11, 2019, Zoosman recorded a EuroLeague career-high of 15 points, shooting 6-of-6 from the field, to go along with six rebounds and two steals, in a 93–76 win over CSKA Moscow. On January 31, 2019, Zoosman was named the Israeli Player of the Month, for games played in January. Zoosman helped Maccabi win the 2019 Israeli League Championship, winning his second straight Israeli League title in the process.

On June 27, 2019, Zoosman joined the Cleveland Cavaliers for the 2019 NBA Summer League.

He was named the 2020 Israeli Basketball Premier League Defensive Player of the Year.

Alba Berlin 
On August 6, 2021, he has signed with Alba Berlin of the German Basketball Bundesliga.

Israeli junior national team
Zoosman was a member of the Under-16, Under-18 and Under-20 Israeli national teams.

In July 2017, Zoosman helped the Israeli Under-20 team reach the 2017 FIBA Europe Under-20 Championship Finals, where they eventually lost to Greece. Zoosman finished the tournament averaging 16.3 points, 5.7 rebounds and 1.9 assists per game.

In July 2018, Zoosman led the Israeli Under-20 team to a gold medal at the 2018 FIBA Europe Under-20 Championship. He finished the tournament averaging 14.4 points, 4.7 rebounds, 3.6 assists and 2.3 steals per game. Zoosman was named the Tournament MVP and also earned a spot in the All-Tournament Team, alongside his teammate Deni Avdija.

Israeli senior national team
Zoosman is a member of the senior Israeli national team. On February 23, 2018, Zoosman made his first appearance for the senior team in a 2019 FIBA Basketball World Cup qualification match against Great Britain.

Career statistics

EuroLeague

|-
| style="text-align:left;"| 2015–16
| style="text-align:left;"| Maccabi
| 1 || 0 || 2.7 || .000 || .000 || .000 || .0 || .0 || .0 || .0 || .0 || .0
|-
| style="text-align:left;"| 2017–18
| style="text-align:left;"| Maccabi
| 14 || 4 || 8.0 || .450 || .364 || 1.000 || .8 || .6 || .3 || .1 || 1.8 || 1.9
|-
| style="text-align:left;"| 2018–19
| style="text-align:left;"| Maccabi
| 30 || 2 || 14.7 || .459 || .375 || .846 || 2.0 || 1.2 || .7 || .2 || 3.0 || 3.7
|-
|- class="sortbottom"
| style="text-align:center;" colspan=2| Career
| 45 || 6 || 12.3 || .457 || .372 || .875 || 1.6 || 1.0 || .5 || .2 || 2.6 || 2.1

References

External links
 Yovel Zoosman at archive.fiba.com
 Yovel Zoosman at basket.co.il
 Yovel Zoosman at euroleague.net
 Yovel Zoosman at realgm.com

1998 births
Living people
Alba Berlin players
Israeli Ashkenazi Jews
Israeli men's basketball players
Jewish men's basketball players
Maccabi Ra'anana players
Maccabi Tel Aviv B.C. players
Shooting guards
Small forwards
People from Kfar Saba